William Eric Phoenix (20 January 1932 – 8 December 2000) was an English professional association footballer of the 1950s. He played in the Football League for Gillingham and Exeter City, making 22 appearances.

References

1932 births
2000 deaths
Footballers from Manchester
English footballers
Association football forwards
Gillingham F.C. players
Exeter City F.C. players
English Football League players